Dalton Day (born August 2, 1991) is an American actor and singer.

Life and career 
Day was born in Cumming, Georgia. Day had the opportunity to be on a film set in Atlanta Georgia with his twin sister in her first film The Adventures of Ociee Nash. Day was home schooled after second grade until high school, when he attended Chaparral High School in Temecula, California. He was a competitive gymnast until a serious skate boarding accident when he was 14 years old. During his recovery time, his parents bought him a guitar. Now, he is a self taught musician/songwriter. Day began acting professionally in 2011. His first acting job was Criminal Minds in 2011. Because of his gymnastics background, stunts come very easily and he enjoys doing his own stunts on set whenever he is allowed.

Personal life 
Day has a twin sister, actress/singer Skyler Day, who is two minutes older than him, and an older sister named Savannah. He started participating in gymnastics at an early age. His parents, David Day and Kelly Karem, were both gymnasts and owned a gym in Norcross, Georgia. His father now works as a recruiter in the construction field. In 2004, he and his family moved to French Valley, California, to allow Skyler to pursue a career in the entertainment industry. He and his family are committed Christians.

Filmography

Discography

Singles

References

External links

1991 births
Living people
21st-century American male actors
Male actors from Georgia (U.S. state)
American male film actors
American male television actors
Fraternal twin male actors
People from Cumming, Georgia
American twins
21st-century American singers
21st-century American male singers